Kari Antero Turunen  (born 5 September 1962), is a Finnish artistic director, choral conductor, ensemble tenor, and music scholar and lecturer.

Life and career

Early life

Turunen was born in September 1962 in Joensuu in Eastern Finland. He spent part of his childhood in Australia.

In his youth, Turunen played the double bass.

Education and academic career

Turunen attended the programme in orchestral and choral conducting at the Sibelius Academy in Helsinki, studying choral conducting with Professor . He received his Diploma in choral conducting in 1998, and graduated as Master of Music in 2000. In his thesis, Turunen analyzes the oratorio Jephtha by Handel. Turunen also attended the University of Helsinki.

Around this time, Turunen also studied with or took part in master classes with musicians such as Stefan Sköld, Eric Ericson, Oren Brown, and the Hilliard Ensemble.

Turunen later returned to academia, receiving his Doctor of Music degree in 2014 at the DocMus Doctoral School of the Sibelius Academy's Faculty of Classical Music, by then part of the University of the Arts Helsinki, with a dissertation on early music performance practice and specifically Giovanni Pierluigi da Palestrina, titled Performing Palestrina: From historical evidence to twenty-first century performance. As part of his doctoral degree, Turunen formed and directed the Ensemble Petraloysio, an all-male ensemble comprising vocalists, an organist, and various other instrumentalists as needed, performing sacred works by Palestrina.

Professional career

1990–2000

In 1990, Turunen was hired as executive director of The Finnish Amateur Musicians' Association Sulasol. He stepped down in 1996.

Also in 1990, early in his career as a choral conductor, Turunen was appointed artistic director of the Chamber Choir EOL, a mixed voice choir affiliated with the University of Helsinki student nation Eteläsuomalainen osakunta. He would direct the choir for twelve years, stepping down in 2002.

He has, been one of the ensemble's tenors ever since. The ensemble has come to be a prominent one on the Finnish early vocal music scene.

In 1998, Turunen was appointed artistic director of the Academic Female Voice Choir Lyran, the only female voice choir affiliated with the University of Helsinki, succeeding Johanna Almark-Mannila. He directed the choir for eleven years, stepping down in 2009, having been appointed artistic director of the Academic Male Voice Choir of Helsinki a year prior. He was succeeded by Jutta Seppinen.

2001–2019

Between 2001 and 2011, Turunen was lecturer of choral conducting at the Pirkanmaa University of Applied Sciences in Tampere, later merged with the Tampere University of Applied Sciences. No longer working as a lecturer in Tampere, he stepped down in 2012.

Turunen succeeded Henrik Wikström as artistic director of Finland's oldest extant choir, the Academic Male Voice Choir of Helsinki, one of two male voice choirs affiliated with the University of Helsinki, in 2008.

In 2011, Turunen not only formed the Ensemble Petraloysio, but was also appointed artistic director of the Helsinki-based mixed voice Kampin Laulu Chamber Choir, as well as the Chorus Cantorum Finlandiæ, a choir comprising Finnish church musicians, originally exclusively performing male voice sacred music, but later including female voices and performing mixed voice sacred music.

In 2013, the mixed voice choir Spira Ensemble was formed in Helsinki, appointing Turunen its first artistic director.

Turunen is artistic director of the annual Aurore Renaissance Music Festival in Helsinki, which was arranged for the first time in 2014.

Turunen is a part-time teacher at the DocMus Doctoral School at the Sibelius Academy's Faculty of Classical Music.

In addition to other commitments, Turunen has been a prolific writer and journalist in the field of music. He also appears regularly as choral teacher and adjudicator.

2019 appointment as conductor of the Vancouver Chamber Choir

In March 2019, it was announced that Turunen had been appointed the new conductor and artistic director of the Vancouver Chamber Choir, beginning in September 2019, succeeding founder and long-time conductor and artistic director Jon Washburn.

Positions of trust

Turunen was chairman of the Finnish Choral Directors' Association from 1997 until 2018.

Accolades

In Marktoberdorf in 2003, conducting the Academic Female Voice Choir Lyran, Turunen received the Pro Musica Viva–Maria Strecker-Daelen award for the best conducting performance interpreting a contemporary choral work.

Turunen was named choral conductor of the year by the Finnish Choral Directors' Association in 2008.

Turunen has been appointed honorary conductor by both the Academic Female Voice Choir Lyran and the Academic Male Voice Choir of Helsinki.

Personal life

Turunen is married and lives with his family in Kerava outside Helsinki. He enjoys English literature and is an avid cricket player; he has held positions of trust in his home club Kerava CC as well as in the Finnish Cricket Association.

Turunen's native language is Finnish, but he is also fluent in Swedish, several of his choirs belonging to Finland's Swedish-language minority, in addition to being fluent in English.

Citations

References

External links

 The Academic Female Voice Choir Lyran
 The Academic Male Voice Choir of Helsinki
 The Aurore Renaissance Music Festival 
 Chamber Choir EOL
 Chorus Cantorum Finlandiæ 
 The Finnish Amateur Musicians' Association
 The Finnish Choral Directors' Association
 Kamarikuoro Näsi
 The Kampin Laulu Chamber Choir
 Lumen Valo
 Spira Ensemble
 The Vancouver Chamber Choir

Living people
1962 births
Finnish choral conductors
Finnish tenors
21st-century conductors (music)
21st-century Finnish male singers